is a railway station operated by Nankai Electric Railway Co., Ltd. in Nishinari-ku, Osaka, Osaka Prefecture, Japan.

Line
Nankai Electric Railway (NK04)
Kōya Line

Layout
Haginochaya is an elevated station with one island platform serving the two easternmost tracks of the four-track right-of-way. Strictly speaking, it belongs to the Nankai Main Line, but only local Koya Line trains stop here.

Adjacent stations

|-
!colspan=5|Nankai Electric Railway (NK04)

References

External links
  Haginochaya Station from Nankai Electric Railway website

Railway stations in Japan opened in 1907
Railway stations in Osaka Prefecture